Bang Mun Nak is a district (amphoe) in the southern part of Phichit province, central Thailand.

History
Bang Mun Nak was the location of the Mueang Phum, an ancient town believed to be part of Phichit Province. In 1903, the province of Phichit was divided into three districts: Mueang Pichit, Bang Khlan, and Mueang Phum. In 1907, the district office moved to a new location on the west bank of the Nan River, north of Wat Bang Mun Nak temple under the name "Mueang Phum District". On 8 March 1916, the district name was changed to Bang Mun Nak and the district office was moved to the east bank of the river.

The name Bang Mun Nak means 'place of otter dung' because at Khlong Busabong (north of Bang Mun Nak market) there were many otters that defecated in the area, so it was called Bang Khi Nak, later changed to Bang Mun Nak.

Geography
Neighboring districts are (from the west clockwise): Pho Thale, Taphan Hin, Thap Khlo, Dong Charoen of Phichit Province; Nong Bua and Chum Saeng of Nakhon Sawan province.

Bang Mun Nak is about 52 km (32 mi) south of Mueang Pichit.

Administration
The district is divided into 10 sub-districts (tambons), which are further subdivided into 78 villages (mubans). Bang Mun Nak is a town (thesaban mueang) which covers tambon, Bang Mun Nak. There are two townships (thesaban tambons): Bang Phai and Wang Taku. Each cover parts of tambons with the same names. There are a further nine tambon administrative organizations (TAO).

Missing numbers are tambons which now form Dong Charoen District.

Transportation
Bang Mun Nak is regarded as one of the three districts of Phichit, with a railroad running through (northern line). The district is served by the Bang Mun Nak railway station of the State Railway of Thailand (SRT).

Notable people
Sanan Kachornprasart, former politician and military officer.

References

External links
amphoe.com (Thai)

Bang Mun Nak